Throughout its history, between 3,200 and 6,000 students died while attending the Canadian Indian residential school system. The exact number remains unknown due to incomplete records. Comparatively few cemeteries associated with residential schools are explicitly referenced in surviving documents; however, the age and duration of the schools suggests that most had a cemetery associated with them. Most cemeteries were unregistered, and as such the locations of many burial sites of residential school children have been lost. The Truth and Reconciliation Commission of Canada has called for "the ongoing identification, documentation, maintenance, commemoration, and protection of residential school cemeteries or other sites at which residential school children were buried."

The Canadian Indian Residential Schools were a network of boarding schools for Indigenous peoples. Directed and funded by the Department of Indian Affairs, and administered mainly by Christian churches, the residential school system removed and isolated Indigenous children from the influence of their own native culture and religion in order to forcefully assimilate them into the dominant Canadian culture. Given that most of them were established by Christian missionaries with the express purpose of converting Indigenous children to Christianity, schools often had nearby mission churches with community cemeteries. Students were often buried in these cemeteries rather than being sent back to their home communities, since the school was expected by the Department of Indian Affairs to keep costs as low as possible. Additionally, occasional outbreaks of disease led to the creation of mass graves when the school had insufficient staff to bury students individually.

Bodies, unmarked graves, and potential burial sites have been identified near residential school sites across Canada since the 1970s, mainly using ground-penetrating radar. To date, the sites of unmarked graves are estimated to hold the remains of more than 1,900 previously unaccounted individuals, mostly children. However, across the entire residential school system, the number of identifiable children who are documented as having died while in their custody is over 4,100 individuals; the fourth volume of the Truth and Reconciliation Commission of Canada "identified  3,200  deaths  on  the  Truth  and  Reconciliation Commission's Register of Confirmed Deaths of Named Residential School Students and the Register of Confirmed Deaths of Unnamed Residential School Students". The issue of unmarked graves gained renewed attention after an anthropologist detected ground disturbances on radar at Kamloops Indian Residential School in May 2021, and concluded that these were 215 "probable burials" (this number was later revised to 200). Several similar announcements followed over the ensuing months, leading to commemorations and protests, as well as leading to a series of arsons against Christian buildings and the 2022 "penitential" visit to Canada by Pope Francis.

Background

The Canadian Indian residential school system was a network of boarding schools for Indigenous peoples. They were funded by the Department of Indian Affairs branch of the Canadian government, and administered by Christian churches across the country. The school system was created to remove and isolate Indigenous children from the influence of their own native culture and religion in order to forcefully assimilate them into the dominant Canadian culture.
The residential school system ran for over 120years, with the last school closing in 1997. A significant number of Indigenous children died while attending residential schools, mostly from disease or fire, with some schools experiencing rates as high as 1death per 20students. Most of the recorded student deaths at residential schools took place before the 1950s. Anti-tuberculosis antibiotics became widely used in the 1950s, which led to a decline in the incidence of the disease.
An exact number of school-related deaths remains unknown due to incomplete records from negligence.
Few school cemeteries are explicitly documented, however given the age of the institutions and the duration of time over which they operated, it is likely that most had a cemetery associated with them. Some were officially associated with schools historically but were overgrown and abandoned after the school closed, while others may have been unmarked burial sites even while the school was in operation. The Truth and Reconciliation Commission Report estimates the number of unmarked graves to be 3,200. However, other sources state this is a conservative estimate, and the actual number could be much higher.

The fourth volume of the Truth and Reconciliation Commission of Canada's (TRC) final report, dedicated to missing children and unmarked burials, was developed after the original TRC members realized, in 2007, that the issue required its own working group. In 2009, the TRC requested $1.5million in extra funding from the federal government to complete this work, but was denied. The researchers concluded, after searching through available records, analyzing satellite imagery and maps of school sites, and visiting a representative sample of sites across the country, that, "for the most part, the cemeteries that the Commission documented are abandoned, disused, and vulnerable to accidental disturbance".This research done by the Commission resulted in the creation of a centralized database of information about where children who died at residential school are buried. Of the 139 recognized residential schools, 59 cemeteries were identified by the commission, and 55 individual reports detailing information about the history of each cemetery were created.

The effort to fully document the children that never returned home from the schools remains ongoing. The Truth and Reconciliation Commission identified 1,953children, 477 where additional investigation is required and an additional 1,242students where they are known to have passed away but their names are not yet known. The National Centre for Truth and Reconciliation (NCTR) has conducted further review of the records and has added an additional 471students to the memorial. This number is expected to climb as additional work is conducted. In total there are presently 4,126children within the national student memorial register. Research efforts by the NCTR are ongoing, and this number will increase over time. At present, the memorial only contains the names of students who attended schools covered by the Indian Residential Schools Settlement Agreement (IRSSA) and does not include students who died while attending day schools or other non-IRSSA schools.

Investigation of unmarked gravesites

Since the 1970s, investigations into unmarked gravesites around residential schools have taken place using a variety of methods, including non-invasive archaeological tools such as ground-penetrating radar. The announcement of preliminary results from one such investigation at the former site of Kamloops Indian Residential School in May 2021 made international news and led to wider and renewed calls to investigate other former school sites for unmarked graves.

Summary

Battleford 

Battleford Industrial School's final principal expressed concern over future generations forgetting the cemetery containing the bodies of former students at the school site:

The land was never officially registered as a cemetery, and became dilapidated and vandalised. In 1974, five students from the Department of Anthropology and Archaeology at the University of Saskatchewan excavated 72 graves at the Battleford school cemetery, constituting nearly all of the 74 people buried in the cemetery.  Most of the people buried there are former students of the Industrial School. During the excavation, the contents of each unmarked grave were uncovered, identified, and recorded, then re-covered and marked with a marble marker, before a chain-link fence was erected around the outside of the site. On August 31, 1975, the burial ground was reconsecrated by the students in a ceremony, during which a cairn was erected with the names of fifty students known to be buried there.

In 2019, the cemetery was designated Provincial Heritage Property by the Government of Saskatchewan.

Sacred Heart (Fort Providence) 
From 1992 to 1994, Albert Lafferty, a Métis resident of Fort Providence, Northwest Territories, led research into the old community cemetery, located near the site of the former Sacred Heart Mission School (operated by the Catholic Church from 1867 to 1960) and the mission's associated hospital. Lafferty was prompted by a desire to follow up on stories he had heard in the community about unmarked graves. He found that the missionaries established the first on that site cemetery in 1868, but relocated the remains of eight missionaries that had been buried there to the present location of the Catholic cemetery in 1929. In relocating, they had left behind the remains of hundreds of Indigenous people buried there, and the cemetery was ploughed over in 1948, after which it became a potato field. Over the course of his research, which was facilitated by the Roman Catholic Diocese of Mackenzie–Fort Smith in Yellowknife and involved the use of ground-penetrating radar, Lafferty identified 298 people likely buried at the site in unmarked graves. This number includes adults, as well as 161 children from across the Dehcho who attended the Sacred Heart Mission School. Some members of the community believe the actual number of interred students is much higher, while a separate study estimates the site holds a total of 150 children and adults. In 2013, a memorial was erected on the site, which lists the names or identities (in the case of individuals whose names are unknown) of the people buried at the site. Since around 2009, former NWT premier Stephen Kakfwi made annual pilgrimages to the site to honour the dead in ceremony, and has encouraged community members, as well as representatives of religious institutions and governments to do the same. In July 2021, Deh Gáh Got’ı̨ę First Nation confirmed that they would try to complete a further search of the former school grounds before the first snowfall, though community healing and acquiring funding were priorities.

St. Joseph's (Dunbow) 
In 1996, a flood eroded the banks of the Highwood River, exposing the caskets and remains of some of the 73 children known to have died while attending Dunbow Industrial School, also referred to as St. Joseph's. In May 2001, the remains of 34 children were identified and re-interred at a site further from the river, following First Nations, Métis, and Christian traditions. Since then, local resident Laurie Sommerville has worked on identifying the names of some of the deceased children, and had identified 27 as of May 2013.

Regina 
In 2010 and 2012, an archaeological survey utilizing ground-penetrating radar was conducted over the south part of the privately owned plot of land that held the cemetery associated with the Regina Indian Industrial School (RIIS). The survey found likely evidence of 38 graves, including 6 outside of the fenced boundary of the cemetery. Documents from 1921 indicated that a prairie fire likely destroyed the wooden crosses marking thirty to forty gravesites. The cemetery is located at the western edge of the former property at 701 Pinkie Road. In 2014, an unpublished report by the Regina Planning Department indicated that the site contained the remains of about 35 First Nations and Métis children, as well as the bodies of two children of the school's first principal. The principal himself and his wife are also known to be buried there, attested by a "small and barely visible gravestone" and "the only surviving marker in the cemetery" as of 2012. In September 2016, the cemetery received municipal heritage status, and in July 2017 it received provincial heritage status. It had been privately owned farmland since the 1980s. According to the CBC, the land was "recovered" in 2011. An arrangement was reached between the private owners of the property the cemetery was on, the RCMP, and the RIIS Commemorative Association, and in 2019, a land transfer ceremony was held to give the land to the Commemorative Association. In the weeks before Canada's first National Day for Truth And Reconciliation on September 30, 2021, 38 orange metal feathers were placed in the ground on the site, to mark the 38 gravesites believed to be located there. The metal markers were donated by Pasqua First Nation and Pro Metal Industries. The site is encircled by a white picket fence.

Kamloops 

In 2021, Sarah Beaulieu, an anthropologist experienced at searching for historical gravesites, surveyed the site of the Kamloops Indian Residential School on the lands of the Tk’emlúps te Secwépemc First Nation with ground-penetrating radar and observed "disruptions in the ground" which she concluded could be 200 unmarked graves, based on "their placement, size, depth, and other features" though "only forensic investigation with excavation" would confirm if these were actually human remains. As of May 2022, the nation had assembled a team of technical archaeologists and professors as they continue their investigation of the site, which Chief Rosanne Casimir described as an ongoing process from "exhumation to memorialization."

Brandon 

Beginning in 2012, a team from the Sioux Valley Dakota Nation and Simon Fraser University investigated two cemetery sites at Brandon Indian Residential School in Brandon. The project, which received funding to continue its work in April 2019, was delayed due to the COVID-19 pandemic.
In addition to two previously known cemeteries, the project found a possible third burial site. 
On June4, 2021, it was announced that 104 potential graves had been located, of which 78 are accountable through historical records.

Marieval 

A community graveyard next to Marieval Indian Residential School in Marieval on the lands of Cowessess First Nation was first used in 1885 prior to the establishment of the school, and as such included not only the graves of children but also adult Catholic parishioners. However, by 2021, only an estimated third of the graves remained marked.

The archbishop of Regina Don Bolen said that the loss of headstones occurred at least partly in the 1960s when an Oblate priest and a local First Nations chief "entered into a conflict" and the priest then used a bulldozer to knock over "huge numbers of tombstones."  One person claiming relatives in the cemetery said he knew the workers who picked up the headstones. In 2019, the Archdiocese of Regina provided the Cowessess First Nation $70,000 to identify the unmarked graves and restore the cemetery.

A subsequent search for unmarked gravesites was delayed two years due to the COVID-19 pandemic.  In May 2021, the Cowessess First Nation announced it would search the site using ground-penetrating radar in collaboration with a group from Saskatchewan Polytechnic. It started on June1 and was expanded four times after anecdotes from elders that bodies had been buried past the school grounds.

On June24, 2021, Cowessess First Nation Chief Cadmus Delorme announced that findings from the preliminary survey indicated the presence of up to 751unmarked graves near the former site of the school. The preliminary figure was the largest number of potential or confirmed unmarked graves associated with a given residential school according to the Federation of Sovereign Indigenous Nations (FSIN), which represents Saskatchewan's First Nations.
Delorme underlined, "This is not a mass grave site. These are unmarked graves."  In noting that the radar technology used had an error rate of 10–15%, he concluded that as a result of the loss of the headstones, "...today, we have over 600 unmarked graves."

On October8, 2021, it was announced that names had been put to 300 of the gravesites. The identification was made possible through the records of the RCMP, the Catholic Church, and Indigenous and Northern Affairs Canada, as well as band members' oral stories.

A press release published January 20, 2022 announced the identification of the 751 unmarked graves as belonging to "both former children who attended the Residential School and locals, both First Nation and non-First Nations," and stating that more research had to be done to be able to "share the true story by identifying which children did not make it home."

Kootenay 

On June 30, 2021, the leadership of ʔaq̓am (a member of the Ktunaxa Nation) announced that 182 unmarked grave sites had been identified  in a cemetery in their community adjacent to the site of the former St. Eugene's Mission Residential School.
During remedial work around the cemetery in 2020, they came upon an "unknown and unmarked grave", and set about to use ground-penetrating radar to identify additional unmarked graves. The graves were marked with wooden crosses which eventually burned or rotted away, resulting in them being unmarked.

The graveyard dates to 1865, before the construction of the school, and has been continuously used for burials by the local settler and indigenous community, including for the St. Eugene Hospital, which operated from 1874 to 1899. The residential school was in operation from 1912 to 1970, and a press release from the First Nation stated that, due to the site's history, it is "extremely difficult to establish whether or not these unmarked graves contain the remains of children who attended the St. Eugene Residential School".

Kuper Island 

In 2018, Penelakut Chief and Council and Elders' Committee met with researchers from the University of British Columbia to discuss a possible survey of the grounds of the former Kuper Island Indian Residential school for unmarked graves using GPR. This work would build on previous GPR surveys conducted in known cemeteries in the community in 2014 and 2016.
In a memo sent to band members on July 8, 2021, Chief Joan Brown of the Penelakut First Nation made reference to the discovery of at least 160"undocumented and unmarked" graves located on the grounds of the former school, off Vancouver Island. The memo was circulated in national media coverage on July 12. It is unclear whether the number referred to new findings.
The school, referred to as "Canada's Alcatraz", was operated on the remote Penelakut Island (formerly Kuper Island) from 1889 to 1969 by the Catholic Church, and from 1969 to 1975 by the federal government.

Williams Lake
In June 2021, a search was announced of the site of St. Joseph's Mission Residential School near Williams Lake, led by Williams Lake First Nation, using ground-penetrating radar, and focusing on 0.15 square kilometres of the 4.5 square kilometre site. Work began in late August 2021. On January 25, 2022, the chief of Williams Lake First Nations announced that 93 potential burial sites were discovered.

Kamsack and Fort Pelly
A search using ground-penetrating radar was conducted by Keeseekoose First Nation on the former grounds of St. Philip's Indian Residential School in Kamsack, Saskatchewan, and the former site of another school near Fort Pelly, which had been erected at the expense of the Oblate Fathers from 1905 to 1913. The search by ground-penetrating radar revealed 42 potential unmarked graves at the Fort Pelly site, and 12 at St. Philip's.

Grouard 
On March 1, 2022, the Kapawe'no First Nation announced the results of a search of 3696.5m2 at the site of St. Bernard's Residential School conducted in October 2021 by the Institute Prairie and Indigenous Archeology from the University of Alberta. The search was led by Dr. Kish Supernant and used ground-penetrating radar and multi-spectral imagery captured by drone. It found 169 potential gravesites that researchers subdivided into three categories, based on confidence intervals. From lowest to highest confidence, the categories they used for the GPR reflections identified in the search are as follows:

 "Possible Grave - Possible, but uncertain. More analysis with an additional non-invasive technique is needed
 "Probable Grave - More likely, but confirmation with an additional technique would improve confidence
 "Likely Grave - Fairly certain of interpretation given that two techniques identified this as a grave. Only next step to "confirm" would be to exhume"

32 possible graves, 129 probable graves, and 8 likely graves were identified in the final summary of the search.

The nation also announced plans to conduct further searches based on the testimony of residential school students. The nation is planning searches of a nearby Anglican church and a site where Indian agents and the North-West Mounted Police had structures.

Lestock 

A cemetery established at the Muscowequan Indian Residential School was rediscovered in 1992 amidst planning for and initial work on a new water line from documentary evidence and inadvertent exhumations during the aborted dig.   Nineteen bodies were found with indications of further graves nearby.  In 2018, a team led by a University of Alberta researcher identified a further ten to fifteen potential gravesites by GPR.  The graves are estimated to contain people of Saulteaux, Cree, Métis as well as European origin, many of whom had fallen ill from an influenza epidemic in the early 1900s.  Further searches are planned.

La Ronge 

A cemetery dating back to at least the early 1900s was situated by the Lac La Ronge Indian Residential School near La Ronge on or adjacent to land that is now the Lac La Ronge Indian Band's urban reserve.  The graveyard served as the last resting place for community members, school staff and possibly students who passed away at the school. While the cemetery retains some headstones, rocks and other grave markings, SNC Lavalin was hired to search for potential unmarked graves using GPR within as well as outside the boundaries where some fear the unbaptized or those who committed suicide were buried.

As of December 23, 2021, the search was about 97 percent complete.  Crosses were put up to mark possible gravesites identified by GPR.

George Gordon 
On April 20, 2022, George Gordon First Nation Chief Byron Bitternose announced that 14 possible grave sites were identified using ground-penetrating radar at the former George Gordon Indian Residential School site. Records from the National Centre for Truth and Reconciliation showed that 49 students died during the school's operation from 1888 to 1996.

Sandy Bay 
Following the announcement from Kamloops in 2021, consultation and a search began at the site of the former Sandy Bay Residential School on Sandy Bay First Nation. The search used ground-penetrating radar and drone imagery. Results of the search were presented to the community in May 2022, having identified 13 potential unmarked grave sites. Four of these sites were determined to have a "moderate probability" of being an unmarked grave and nine sites were assessed as possessing a "low probability" of being graves. Further steps had not been decided by the community as of May 29, 2022.

Saddle Lake 
Since 2004, partial remains have been repeatedly discovered while digging new graves in the Saddle Lake Cree Nation community cemetery, located near the site where the Blue Quills Indian Residential School once stood. At the time, the remains were re-interred upon discovery, but investigators undertaking the nation's efforts to discover unmarked graves on their territory announced on May 17, 2022, that they believed those accidentally excavated remains were the remains of children who died at residential school. The investigators believe that the discoveries include a mass grave, where they found "numerous children-sized skeletons wrapped in white cloth," theorizing that the potential mass grave could have been from a typhoid outbreak at the school. In an effort to prevent further accidental excavations, the nation has requested funding to acquire ground-penetrating radar equipment and carry out a non-invasive survey. A report released in January 2023 included information that the presumed mass grave had been confirmed by ground-penetrating radar.

Fort Alexander 
As of late July 2021, the Sagkeeng First Nation had begun a search of the former site of Fort Alexander Indian Residential School, near Powerview-Pine Falls in Manitoba. The search made use of drone surveying and ground-penetrating radar. On June 6, 2022, the Nation announced they had identified 190 "anomalies" in the ground during the search: 137 in one area and 53 in another. The anomalies were not found at the site of the residential school. Having ruled out pipelines, sewer lines, and waterlines, work continued following the announcement to determine whether the anomalies were gravesites.

Qu'Appelle 

As part of a project begun in November 2021, Star Blanket Cree Nation carried out a search of the former grounds of Qu'Appelle Indian Residential School in fall and winter 2022 using ground-penetrating radar. On January 12, 2023, preliminary findings were announced, which included over 2000 "hits" on ground-penetrating radar and the discovery of a fragment of the jawbone of a child between the ages of 4 and 6, which was estimated by the Saskatchewan Coroners Service to be approximately 125 years old. The "hits" registered on the ground-penetrating radar are not all suspected to be graves, and the ground search leader said they could be "anomalies" like tree roots or rocks. Further work is set to continue as of January 2023.

St. Mary's (Ontario) 
On January 17, 2023, a statement released by Wauzhushk Onigum Nation announced the discovery of 171 "anomalies", which the statement also called "plausible burials", located by ground-penetrating radar around the site of the former St. Mary's Indian Residential School. According to the statement, "The Nation’s next steps are to gain greater certainty on the number of plausible graves in the cemetery grounds using additional technologies and to conduct additional investigations at several additional sites not covered during the initial investigations that are in the vicinity of the school."

To be determined 
A number of First Nations have announced searches for unmarked graves at various former residential school sites. Some of these searches were already underway prior to the Kamloops confirmation. Below are a list of school sites announced thus far:
Ahousaht Indian Residential School, in Ahousat – search led by Ahousaht First Nation.
Alberni Indian Residential School, near Tseshaht First Nation – search led by Tseshaht First Nation, initially announced August 2021. As of December 2021, the Nation had secured over $1 million to undertake research and scanning of the site and developed a research framework, with a goal to do an initial GPR scan in the spring of 2022. The search began in earnest in July 2022.
Chooutla Indian Residential School, in Carcross – search led by Chooutla Working Group, scheduled to begin in summer 2022, and search seven other sites (including sites of former hostels) across Yukon likely beginning 2023.
Old Sun (Blackfoot) Indian Residential School and Crowfoot Indian Residential School near Gleichen – search led by Siksika Nation using  in collaboration with the Institute for Prairie and Indigenous Archaeology at the University of Alberta. Site clean-up began in early August 2021, and a community info session was held in September 2021.
In 2022, the Dene Nation proposed a $500,000 plan to the government to investigate 15 residential school locations for unmarked burial sites identified by the Truth and Reconciliation Committee.  The schools are Immaculate Conception (Roman Catholic) and All Saints (Anglican) in Aklavik, Fleming Hall in Fort McPherson, Sacred Heart in Fort Providence, St. Joseph's in Fort Resolution, Bompas Hall (Anglican) in Fort Simpson and Deh Cho Lapointe Hall, St. Peter's in Hay River, Grollier Hall (Roman Catholic) and Stringer Hall (Anglican) in Inuvik, Akaitcho Hall in Yellowknife, Federal Hostel in Délı̨nę, and All Saints in Shingle Point, Yukon.
Ermineskin Indian Residential School – search announced August 2021, overseen by a group of elders from Ermineskin Cree Nation, carried out by engineers from SNC-Lavalin using .
Guy Hill Indian Residential School near The Pas – search led by Opaskwayak Cree Nation using ; Nation was preparing for the search as of late July 2021.
McKay Indian Residential School near Dauphin – search led by Opaskwayak Cree Nation using , conducted by SNC-Lavalin; Nation began the search in Fall 2021, paused for the winter, and is set to resume in June 2022. As of May 29, 2022, no unmarked graves have been identified, though only a fraction of the search area has been covered.
Mohawk Institute in Six Nations – investigation to be carried out by Six Nations Police, along with Brantford Police and OPP, overseen by a "Survivor's Secretariat" headed by Kimberly Murray, former executive director of the Truth and Reconciliation Commission. An unmarked burial site believed to contain the remains of an adolescent was found near the site in August 2020, and as of October 2021, investigations were underway to identify more of the identity of this child, how they came to be buried there, as well as whether their death can be linked to the residential school. A search of the former school grounds began in November 2021.
Mount Elgin Indian Residential School in Chippewas of the Thames First Nation – on the first National Day for Truth and Reconciliation, September 30, 2020, Chippewas of the Thames announced that a probe into the site was in its early stages. 
Pine Creek First Nation, near Camperville, Manitoba, began a  scan on May9, 2022.
The site of Sacred Heart Mission School in Fort Providence, NWT – led by Deh Gáh Got’ı̨ę First Nation following the earlier identification of an unmarked cemetery in the early 1990s.
The site of Sept-Îles Residential School (Notre-Dame de Sept-Îles) in Sept-Îles, Quebec – a group of Innu chiefs announced in June 2021 that they would put together a team to begin the process of conducting searches of the site for unmarked graves.
Spanish Indian Residential Schools in Spanish, Ontario – members of the Sagamok Anishnawbek, Mississauga and Serpent River First Nations, which came together as the Nisoonag (Three Canoes) Partnership, held a ceremony on Saturday, September 18, 2021, to ask for the permission of the souls of the children possibly buried at the site of the schools. Other gatherings were held in June and October 2021, to reflect and prepare to apply for government funding to help with a search, and in February 2022 was announced that such a search would be taking place over the following 2–3 years.
St. Anne's Indian Residential School in Fort Albany, Ontario – led by Fort Albany First Nation in collaboration with nearby communities, began in 2020 and ongoing as of April 2022.
St. Michael's Indian Residential School, in Alert Bay – led by 'Namgis First Nation; the search was in "early stages" as of July 2021, and a press release in February 2022 officially announced the start of the inquiry, detailing plans for community engagement, contracting a project manager, and erecting a monument following the investigation.
St. Paul's Indian Residential School (Squamish), in North Vancouver – Joint investigation to uncover documents associated with the former residential school, as well as identify the burial sites of children that died while attending the school led by Squamish Nation, Musqueam Nation and Tsleil-Waututh Nation, in collaboration with the Roman Catholic Archdiocese of Vancouver, announced August 10, 2021.
Thunderchild Indian Residential School in Delmas – search led by Battlefords Agency Tribal Chiefs, in association with SNC-Lavalin. An initial ground-penetrating radar search in July 2021 of the immediate area around the school site found no graves, but elder testimony and records indicate that 44 children died at the school and there are graves to be found; the gravestone of 14-year old Henry Atcheynum was found by a farmer about a kilometre from the search area. This, and student's testimony that graves were moved as much as twice has led to BATC expanding the search area to the Saskatchewan River. The BATC also plans to search the Battleford Industrial Residential School once the Delmas search is complete.
The Tla-o-qui-aht First Nations were also engaged in an investigation as of August 17, 2021.

In 2021, the Stó:lō Nation announced a three-year investigation for the presence of unmarked graves at Fraser Valley residential schools, including around the historic mission and school cemetery at the former site of St. Mary's Indian Residential School in Mission, the Methodist-run Coqualeetza Residential School grounds in Chilliwack, and the All Hallows Residential School in Yale.  A historic 1958 funeral photo shows at least twelve graves outside the current St. Mary's cemetery fence line, an area now covered by blackberry bushes with the iron cross grave markers lying along the cemetery perimeter.  The Coqualeetza grounds had a cemetery, but the remains were dug up and moved to three or four First Nations cemeteries in Chilliwack when the school closed in 1940 for conversion to a children's hospital in 1941.  In addition to searches of known graveyards, they plan to search for any unrecorded graves as informal burials is not uncommon among Stó:lō communities.  The search will entail archival research and GPR, with confirmation of any findings by exhumation prior to a commemoration to be decided later.  Although no progress had been made in the estimated $3 million plan proposed to the government, memorial house post carvings were erected at the sites of the government-run St. Mary's second location (now,  Pekw'Xe:yles Indian Reserve) and Coqualeetza later that year to honor victims of abuse such as at the former institution and those that passed away.

Reactions 

Community memorials have been set up at the Vancouver Art Gallery, the Ontario Legislative Building, as well as various government buildings and church buildings that had been in charge of running the residential school system.

Prime Minister Justin Trudeau asked that flags on all federal buildings be flown at half-mast.
On June2, 2021, the federal government pledged C$27 million in immediate funding to the National Centre for Truth and Reconciliation to identify the unmarked graves.
The provincial governments of British Columbia, Alberta, Saskatchewan, Manitoba and Ontario also pledged C$12million, C$8million, C$2million, C$2.5million and C$10million, respectively, to fund searches.
MPs Mumilaaq Qaqqaq and Charlie Angus have called on Justice Minister David Lametti to launch an independent investigation on crimes against humanity in Canada. Canada Day festivities were cancelled in some communities in British Columbia, Alberta, Northern Saskatchewan and New Brunswick.

The Canadian School Boards Association has asked for the development of a Canada-wide curriculum on Indigenous history, to be taught from kindergarten to Grade12.
In New Brunswick, Education Minister Dominic Cardy said the education curriculum would be amended to teach about the province's Indigenous day schools.

The United Nations Human Rights Office and independent UN human rights experts have called on Canada and the Holy See to investigate the uncoveries.
Similar sentiments were echoed by the governments of China, Russia, Belarus, Iran, North Korea, Syria and Venezuela.

The identification of possible gravesites at Kamloops has been followed by calls for name changes and removals of monuments commemorating figures controversial for their colonial views or policies towards Indigenous peoples. These include monuments to Egerton Ryerson, John A. Macdonald, Hector-Louis Langevin, Oscar Blackburn, Vital-Justin Grandin, and James Cook. The doors of St. Paul's Cathedral in Saskatoon were covered in paint on June24.

Additionally, although Canada has, since before Confederation, been a constitutional monarchy, in which the sovereign does not make policy and must follow the directions given by ministers and parliamentarians, a school named after Prince Charles was renamed,
and statues of Queen Victoria and Queen Elizabeth II were toppled by protesters.

A nationwide survey of editors published by the Canadian Press voted the topic "Children who never returned from residential schools" as the Canadian Newsmakers of the Year in 2021.

Church fires

By July4, 2021 nearly two dozen churches, including eight on First Nations territories, had been burned. Some indigenous leaders, the prime minister, and provincial officials have condemned the suspected arsons.

Harsha Walia, the executive director of the British Columbia Civil Liberties Association, tweeted "burn it all down", and the Union of British Columbia Indian Chiefs expressed "strong solidarity with (Harsha Walia) in condemning the brutally gruesome genocide of residential ‘school’ system by Canada and Church while crown stole FN land".

Call for investigation into Duplessis Orphans 

Numerous Duplessis Orphans were committed, some wrongfully, by the provincial government of Quebec into psychiatric hospitals run by the Catholic Church in the 1940s and 1950s and possibly buried there.  The publicity and government response concerning the situation at residential schools renewed calls for the Quebec government and the Catholic Church to excavate the sites of these hospitals, with a class action lawsuit launched in 2018 denouncing the lack of a "true apology" by the government and religious organizations.

Investigations that found no gravesites

Shubenacadie 
From April 2020 to July 2021, an investigation of the site of the former Shubenacadie Indian Residential School in Shubenacadie was led by a member of the Sipekneꞌkatik First Nation who is a curator with the Nova Scotia Museum, along with an associate professor from Saint Mary's University. The residential school operated from 1929 to 1967, and the building burned to the ground in 1986. The land is now occupied by a plastics factory and used as farmland. The National Centre for Truth and Reconciliation lists 16 children who died while attending the school, and the community feared more had been buried at the site. Evidence had been identified that indicated unmarked graves on the site, but they predated the school's founding by a century. The investigation made use of ground-penetrating radar and aerial laser scanning. On August4, 2021, the Sipekneꞌkatik First Nation issued a press release stating the investigation had concluded, confirming that it was unable to find any unmarked graves of children who had died while at the school. Having searched about 70% of the former school grounds, the First Nation received money from the federal government in April 2022 to go towards completing the fieldwork, along with knowledge gathering, and commemorating the school's legacy.

Media reporting in 2021 
In July 2021, a New York Times article "'Horrible History'" sparked interest in the matter. In May 2022, the National Post article "The year of the graves" said that despite the saturation of news coverage and their consequences, nothing new had been added to the public record that was not already known and that "it wasn't the Indigenous people directly involved who made the disturbing claims that ended up in the headlines".

See also 
Christianity and colonialism
Genocide recognition politics § Canada
List of Indian residential schools in Canada
Snuneymuxw First Nation § Nanaimo Indian Hospital, for the Snuneymuxw First Nation's investigation into unmarked graves around an Indian hospital

References 

2021 controversies
2021 in Canada
Anti-Indigenous racism in Canada
Arson in Canada
Attacks on churches in North America
Christianity-related controversies
History of Indigenous peoples in Canada
Indigenous child displacement in Canada
Residential schools in Canada
Controversies in Canada
Scandals in Canada
Human rights abuses in Canada